In the theory of superalgebras, if A is a commutative superalgebra, V is a free right A-supermodule and T is an endomorphism from V to itself, then the supertrace of T, str(T) is defined by the following trace diagram:

More concretely, if we write out T in block matrix form after the decomposition into even and odd subspaces as follows,

then the supertrace

str(T) = the ordinary trace of T00 − the ordinary trace of T11.

Let us show that the supertrace does not depend on a basis.
Suppose e1, ..., ep are the even basis vectors and ep+1, ..., ep+q are the odd basis vectors. Then, the components of T, which are elements of A, are defined as

The grading of Tij is the sum of the gradings of T, ei, ej mod 2.

A change of basis to e1', ..., ep', e(p+1)', ..., e(p+q)' is given by the supermatrix

and the inverse supermatrix

where of course, AA−1 = A−1A = 1 (the identity).

We can now check explicitly that the supertrace is basis independent.  In the case where T is even, we have

In the case where T is odd, we have

The ordinary trace is not basis independent, so the appropriate trace to use in the Z2-graded setting is the supertrace.

The supertrace satisfies the property

for all T1, T2 in End(V).  In particular, the supertrace of a supercommutator is zero.

In fact, one can define a supertrace more generally for any associative superalgebra E over a commutative superalgebra A as a linear map tr: E -> A which vanishes on supercommutators. Such a supertrace is not uniquely defined; it can always at least be modified by multiplication by an element of A.

Physics applications

In supersymmetric quantum field theories, in which the action integral is invariant under a set of symmetry transformations (known as supersymmetry transformations) whose algebras are superalgebras, the supertrace has a variety of applications.  In such a context, the supertrace of the mass matrix for the theory can be written as a sum over spins of the traces of the mass matrices for particles of different spin:

In anomaly-free theories where only renormalizable terms appear in the superpotential, the above supertrace can be shown to vanish, even when supersymmetry is spontaneously broken.   

The contribution to the effective potential arising at one loop (sometimes referred to as the Coleman-Weinberg potential) can also be written in terms of a supertrace.  If  is the mass matrix for a given theory, the one-loop potential can be written as

See also
 Berezinian

References

Super linear algebra